The men's pole vault event at the 2014 Asian Games was held at the Incheon Asiad Main Stadium, Incheon, South Korea on 28 September.

Schedule
All times are Korea Standard Time (UTC+09:00)

Records

Results 
Legend
DNS — Did not start
NM — No mark

References

Results

Pole vault men
2014 men